Star Wars: The Trading Card Game is an out-of-print collectible card game produced by Wizards of the Coast (WotC). The original game was created by game designer Richard Garfield, the creator of the first modern trading card game, Magic: The Gathering. After its initial release in April 2002, the game was 'put on indefinite hold' by WotC in late 2005. The Star Wars Trading Card Game Independent Development Committee was created by a group of fans to continue development of the game. They design new cards that are available as free downloads at their website.

Game play
The Star Wars: TCG focuses on gaining control of in-game arenas. In this two-player game, each player controls units which battle in the arenas. The main way to win is to take control of two of the three arenas. Some cards also add new win conditions for the game. 

The three arenas are Space, Ground and Character, and feature units from the Star Wars films, such as Star Destroyers, starfighters, AT-ATs, armies, and characters like Luke Skywalker, Anakin Skywalker, Padmé Amidala, Mara Jade, and Darth Vader. There is also a build zone, a draw pile (for your deck), and a discard pile. The two sides to the game are the Dark side and the Light side, representing the two sides of the Force. There are also neutral cards, which can be used by either side. 

There are several types of cards. They are:
Units: these can control arenas and are the most plentiful card in any deck. Each unit can only be placed in a certain arena designated by color and subtype. All units have several statistics including: build cost, speed, power, health, alignment. Units must be built.
Space: These units have a blue border and represent the space ships throughout the Star Wars films and books.
Ground: These units have a green border and represent the ground forces in the Star Wars films and books.
Character: These units have a purple border and represent the people and aliens found throughout the Star Wars films and books.
Battle: These cards have special one time use effects and can only be used while your units are doing battle. They don't need to be built and some can be enhanced for an extra cost to give the user a better effect.
Mission: These cards are like battle cards, but must be built. Their effects differ and must be played in the build step.
Location: This type of card affects its arena until it is replaced with another Location card. Most location cards are colored like units and can only be placed in specific arenas. Some locations can be placed in any arena and are not colored like any normal unit.
Equipment:This card type represents the weapons and vehicle upgrades in the Star Wars universe. These cards have a silver border and enhance the unit they are equipped to.

Abilities
Activated Abilities
These are abilities that units have on them and are used by paying a cost (usually force).
Static Abilities
These abilities are on as long as the unit is in its arena (e.g. A unit has "Each of your other characters get +10 speed", as long as that unit is in its arena, all your characters gain 10 speed).
Triggered Abilities
These abilities contain a "when" or "whenever" (e.g. a unit has "When this unit is discarded draw three cards." "When this unit is discarded" is the trigger, and "draw three cards" is the ability).

TCG Sets

Playing the game
This is a two-player game. The following is recommended for each player, but can be shared among friends and opponents in casual play:
two sixty-card decks (one Light side, one Dark side)
several dice (six sided)
a method of tracking Force points (counters, pen and paper, or a twenty sided die)
damage counters
build counters (can be the same as damage counters)

Reviews
Pyramid

Further reading
Strategy in Scrye #68

References

External links
Star Wars TCG website
SWTCG Independent Development Committee
SWTCG French Site / Edité par joueurs
Play Star Wars TCG Online

Card games introduced in 2002
Collectible card games
TCG
Richard Garfield games
Wizards of the Coast games